Michael Friedrich Möllenbeck (12 December 1969 – 2 November 2022) was a German discus thrower.

Möllenbeck's greatest achievements were two World Championship bronze medals, and his bronze at the 2005 World Championships was especially welcome as Germany struggled to win medals. His personal best throw was 67.64 metres, achieved in June 2002 in Dortmund. This ranks him seventh among German discus throwers, behind Jürgen Schult, Lars Riedel, Wolfgang Schmidt, Armin Lemme, Hein-Direck Neu and Alwin Wagner.

Möllenbeck married fellow discus thrower Anja Gündler in 1996. He died on 2 November 2022, at the age of 52.

Achievements

References

External links
 
 
 

1969 births
2022 deaths
People from Wesel
Sportspeople from Düsseldorf (region)
German male discus throwers
Athletes (track and field) at the 1996 Summer Olympics
Athletes (track and field) at the 2000 Summer Olympics
Athletes (track and field) at the 2004 Summer Olympics
Olympic athletes of Germany
World Athletics Championships medalists
European Athletics Championships medalists